Dorothea Lange (born Dorothea Margaretta Nutzhorn; May 26, 1895 – October 11, 1965) was an American documentary photographer and photojournalist, best known for her Depression-era work for the Farm Security Administration (FSA). Lange's photographs influenced the development of documentary photography and humanized the consequences of the Great Depression.

Early life 

Lange was born in Hoboken, New Jersey to second-generation German immigrants Johanna Lange and Heinrich Nutzhorn. She had a younger brother named Martin. Two early events shaped Lange’s path as a photographer. 
First, at age seven she contracted Polio, which left her with a weakened right leg and a permanent limp. "It formed me, guided me, instructed me, helped me, and humiliated me," Lange once said of her altered gait. "I've never gotten over it, and I am aware of the force and power of it." Second, five years later, her father abandoned the family, prompting a move from suburban New Jersey to a poorer neighborhood in New York City. Later she dropped her father's family name and took her mother's maiden name.

Growing up on Manhattan's Lower East Side, she attended PS 62 on Hester Street, where she was "one of the only gentiles—quite possibly the only—in a class of 3000 Jews." "Left on her own while her mother worked, Lange wandered the streets of New York, fascinated by the variety of people she saw. She learned to observe without intruding, a skill she would later use as a documentary photographer."

Career 

Lange graduated from the Wadleigh High School for Girls, New York City; by this time, even though she had never owned or operated a camera, she had already decided that she would become a photographer. She began her study of photography at Columbia University under the tutelage of Clarence H. White, and later gained informal apprenticeships with several New York photography studios, including that of Arnold Genthe.

In 1918, she left New York with a female friend intending to travel the world, but her plans were disrupted upon being robbed. She settled in San Francisco where she found work as a 'finisher' in a photographic supply shop. There she became acquainted with other photographers and met an investor who backed her in establishing a successful portrait studio. In 1920, she married the noted western painter Maynard Dixon, with whom she had two sons, Daniel, born in 1925, and John, born in 1930.  Lange's studio business supported her family for the next fifteen years. Lange's early studio work mostly involved shooting portrait photographs of the social elite in San Francisco. But at the onset of the Great Depression, she turned her lens from the studio to the street. 

In the depths of the worldwide Depression, 1933, some fourteen million people in the U.S. were out of work; many were homeless, drifting aimlessly, often without enough food to eat. In the midwest and southwest drought and dust storms added to the economic havoc. During the decade of the 1930s some 300,000 men, women, and children migrated west to California, hoping to find work. Broadly, these migrant families were called by the opprobrium "Okies" (as from Oklahoma) regardless of where they came from. They traveled in old, dilapidated cars or trucks, wandering from place to place to follow the crops. Lange began to photograph these luckless folk, leaving her studio to document their lives in the streets and roads of California. She roamed the byways with her camera, portraying the extent of the social and economic upheaval of the Depression. It is here that Lange found her purpose and direction as a photographer. She was no longer a portraitist; but neither was she a photojournalist. Instead, she became known as one of the first of a new kind, a "documentary" photographer.

Her photographic studies of the unemployed and homeless—starting with White Angel Breadline (1933), which depicted a lone man facing away from the crowd in front of a soup kitchen run by a widow known as the White Angel—captured the attention of local photographers and media, and eventually led to her employment with the federal Resettlement Administration (RA), later called the Farm Security Administration (FSA).

Lange developed personal techniques of talking with her subjects while working, putting them at ease and enabling her to document pertinent remarks to accompany the photography. The titles and annotations often revealed personal information about her subjects.

Resettlement Administration

Lange and Dixon divorced on October 28, 1935 and on December 6 she married economist Paul Schuster Taylor, professor of economics at the University of California, Berkeley. For the next five years they traveled through the California coast and the midwest. Throughout their travels they documented rural poverty, in particular the exploitation of sharecroppers and migrant laborers. Taylor interviewed subjects and gathered economic data while Lange produced photographs and accompanying data. They lived and worked from Berkeley for the rest of her life.

Working for the Resettlement Administration and Farm Security Administration, Lange's images brought to public attention the plight of the poor and forgotten—particularly sharecroppers, displaced farm families, and migrant workers. Lange's work was distributed to newspapers across the country, and the poignant images became icons of the era.

One of Lange's most recognized works is Migrant Mother, published in 1936. The woman in the photograph is Florence Owens Thompson. In 1960, Lange spoke about her experience taking the photograph:

Lange reported the conditions at the camp to the editor of a San Francisco newspaper, showing him her photographs. The editor informed federal authorities and published an article that included some of the images. In response, the government rushed aid to the camp to prevent starvation.

According to Thompson's son, while Lange got some details of the story wrong, the impact of the photograph came from an image that projected both the strengths and needs of migrant workers. Twenty-two of Lange's photographs produced for the FSA were included in John Steinbeck's The Harvest Gypsies when it was first published in 1936 in The San Francisco News. According to an essay by photographer Martha Rosler, Migrant Mother became the most reproduced photograph in the world.

Japanese American internment

In 1941, Lange was awarded a prestigious Guggenheim Fellowship for achievement in photography. But after the attack on Pearl Harbor, she gave up the fellowship in order to go on assignment for the War Relocation Authority (WRA) to document the forced evacuation of Japanese Americans from the west coast of the US. She covered the internment of Japanese Americans and their subsequent incarceration, traveling throughout urban and rural California to photograph families required to leave their houses and hometowns on orders of the government. Lange visited several temporary assembly centers as they opened, eventually fixing on Manzanar, the first of the permanent internment camps, (located in eastern California, some 300 miles from the coast).

Much of Lange's work focused on the waiting and anxiety caused by the forced collection and removal of people: piles of luggage waiting to be sorted; families waiting for transport, wearing identification tags; young-to-elderly individuals, stunned, not comprehending why they must leave their homes, or what their future held. (See Exclusion, removal, detention). To many observers, Lange's photography—including one photo of American school children pledging allegiance to the flag shortly before being removed from their homes and schools and sent to internment—is a haunting reminder of the travesty of incarcerating people who are not charged with committing a crime.

Sensitive to the implications of her images, authorities impounded most of Lange's photography of the internment process—these photos were not seen publicly during the war. Today her photography of the evacuations and internments is available in the National Archives on the website of the Still Photographs Division and at the Bancroft Library of the University of California, Berkeley.

California School of Fine Arts and San Francisco Art Institute

In 1945, Ansel Adams invited Lange to teach at the first fine art photography department at the California School of Fine Arts (CSFA), now known as San Francisco Art Institute (SFAI). Imogen Cunningham and Minor White also joined the faculty.

Aperture 
In 1952, Lange co-founded the photography magazine Aperture. In the mid-1950s, Life magazine commissioned Lange and Pirkle Jones to shoot a documentary about the death of the town of Monticello, California, and the subsequent displacement of its residents by the damming of Putah Creek to form Lake Berryessa. After Life decided not run the piece, Lange devoted an entire issue of Aperture to the work. The collection was shown at the Art Institute of Chicago in 1960.

Another series for Life, begun in 1954 and featuring the attorney Martin Pulich, grew out of Lange's interest in how poor people were defended in the court system, which by one account, grew out of personal experience associated with her brother's arrest and trial.

Death and legacy 

Lange's health declined in the last decade of her life. Among other ailments she suffered from was what later was identified as post-polio syndrome. She died of esophageal cancer on October 11, 1965, in San Francisco, at age seventy. She was survived by her second husband, Paul Taylor, two children, three stepchildren, and numerous grandchildren and great-grandchildren.

Three months after her death, the Museum of Modern Art in New York City mounted a retrospective of her work that Lange had helped to curate. It was MoMA's first retrospective solo exhibition of the works of a female photographer. In February 2020, MoMA exhibited her work again, with the title "Dorothea Lange: Words and Pictures," prompting critic Jackson Arn to write that "the first thing" this exhibition "needs to do—and does quite well—is free her from the history textbooks where she’s long been jailed." Contrasting her work with that of other twentieth century photographers such as Eugène Atget and André Kertész whose images "were in some sense context-proof, Lange’s images tend to cry out for further information. Their aesthetic power is obviously bound up in the historical importance of their subjects, and usually that historical importance has had to be communicated through words." That characteristic has caused "art purists" and "political purists" alike to criticize Lange's work, which Arn argues is unfair: "The relationship between image and story," Arn notes, was often altered by Lange's employers as well as by government forces when her work did not suit their commercial purposes or undermined their political purposes. In his review of this exhibition, critic Brian Wallis also stressed the distortions in the "afterlife of photographs" that often went contrary to Lange's intentions. Finally, Jackson Arn situates Lange's work alongside other Depression-era artists such as Pearl Buck, Margaret Mitchell, Thornton Wilder, John Steinbeck, Frank Capra, Thomas Hart Benton, and Grant Wood in terms of their role creating a sense of the national "We".

In 1984 Lange was inducted into the International Photography Hall of Fame and Museum.  In 2003, Lange was inducted into the National Women's Hall of Fame. In 2006, an elementary school was named in her honor in Nipomo, California, near the site where she had photographed Migrant Mother. In 2008, she was inducted into the California Hall of Fame, located at The California Museum for History, Women and the Arts. Her son, Daniel Dixon, accepted the honor in her place. In October 2018, Lange's hometown of Hoboken, New Jersey honored her with a mural depicting Lange and two other prominent women from Hoboken's history, Maria Pepe and Dorothy McNeil. In 2019, Rafael Blanco painted a mural of Lange outside of a photography building in Roseville, California.

Collections
 Kalamazoo Institute of Arts
 Museum of Modern Art, New York
 Whitney Museum of American Art
 Los Angeles County Museum of Art
 Oakland Museum of California

See also
 Marion Post Wolcott
 Martha Gellhorn
 Wheelers Primitive Baptist Church

References

Further reading

External links 
 Dorothea Lange Digital Archive at Oakland Museum of California
 Oakland Museum of California – Dorothea Lange 
 Online Archive of California: Guide to the Lange (Dorothea) Collection 1919–1965
 
 Dorothea Lange – "A Photographers Journey", at Gendell Gallery
 1964 Oral history interview with Lange
 Dorothea Lange Yakima Valley, Washington Collection, Great Depression in Washington State Project
 Photographic Equality, by David J. Marcou, October 8, 2009
 Encyclopædia Britannica

1895 births
1965 deaths
Artists from Hoboken, New Jersey
American people of German descent
American photojournalists
People with polio
Artists from Oakland, California
American portrait photographers
Social realist artists
San Francisco Art Institute faculty
Social documentary photographers
American women journalists
Artists from the San Francisco Bay Area
Artists from California
Deaths from cancer in California
Deaths from esophageal cancer
20th-century American women photographers
20th-century American photographers
American women academics
Women photojournalists